Tallman East Airport   is a private airport in Tower City, Pennsylvania. It is used for private aviation. The airport is owned by the Tallman Brothers.

External links

FBO Web: - Tallman East Airport
Great Circle Mapper: - Tallman East Airport

Airports in Pennsylvania
Transportation buildings and structures in Schuylkill County, Pennsylvania